The National Museum of Natural History (Natsionalen prirodonauchen muzey; abbreviated НПМ, NMNHS) of Bulgaria is a natural history museum located in Sofia, the capital of Bulgaria, on Tsar Osvoboditel Boulevard, next to the Russian church. Founded in 1889, it is affiliated with the Bulgarian Academy of Sciences, and is the first and largest museum of this kind in the Balkans.

The Museum's collection includes over 400 stuffed mammals, over 1,200 species of birds, hundreds of thousands of insects and other invertebrates, as well as samples of about one quarter of the world's mineral species.

The National Museum of Natural History was founded in 1889 as the Natural History Museum of Knyaz Ferdinand of Bulgaria, with various foreign and Bulgarian specialists (e.g. Ivan Buresh, director from 1913 to 1947) serving as its directors until 1947, when the museum became part of the Bulgarian Academy of Sciences' Zoological Institute. The Museum became autonomous as a separate institute within the system of BAS in 1974. In 1992, the Asenovgrad Palaeontology Museum, an NMNH branch in Asenovgrad, was formed.

Currently the museum publishes Historia naturalis bulgarica journal.

Departments 
 Palaeontology and Mineralogy
 Botany
 Invertebrates
 Vertebrates

See also 
 Boyan Petrov

External links 
 Official website of the National Museum of Natural History (in Bulgarian and English)

Museums in Sofia
Natural History Museum
Museums established in 1889
Natural history museums in Bulgaria
Science museums in Bulgaria
Fossil museums
Geology museums in Bulgaria